James Hubert "Eubie" Blake (February 7, 1887 – February 12, 1983) was an American pianist and  composer of ragtime, jazz, and popular music. In 1921, he and his long-time collaborator Noble Sissle wrote Shuffle Along, one of the first Broadway musicals written and directed by African Americans. Blake's compositions included such hits as "Bandana Days", "Charleston Rag", "Love Will Find a Way", "Memories of You" and "I'm Just Wild About Harry". The 1978 Broadway musical Eubie! showcased his works; in 1981, President Ronald Reagan awarded Blake the Presidential Medal of Freedom.

Early years
Blake was born at 319 Forrest Street in Baltimore, Maryland. Of the many children born to former slaves Emily "Emma" Johnstone and John Sumner Blake, he was the only one to survive childhood. John Sumner Blake was a stevedore on the Baltimore Docks.

Blake claimed in later life to have been born in 1883, but records published beginning in 2003—U.S. Census, military, and Social Security records and Blake's passport application and passport—uniformly give his birth year as 1887.

Music

Blake's musical training began when he was four or five. While out shopping with his mother, he wandered into a music store, climbed onto the bench of an organ, and started "foolin’ around". When his mother found him, the store manager told her: "The child is a genius! It would be criminal to deprive him of the chance to make use of such a sublime, God-given talent." The Blakes purchased a pump organ for US$75.00, making payments of 25 cents a week. When Blake was seven, he received music lessons from a neighbor, Margaret Marshall, an organist for the Methodist church. At age 15, without his parents' knowledge, he began playing piano at Aggie Shelton's Baltimore bordello. Blake gained his first big break in the music business in 1907, when world champion boxer Joe Gans hired him to play the piano at Gans's Goldfield Hotel, the first "black and tan club" in Baltimore. Blake played at the Goldfield during the winters from 1907 to 1914, and spent his summers playing clubs in Atlantic City. During this period, he also studied composition in Baltimore with Llewellyn Wilson.

According to Blake, he also worked the medicine show circuit and was employed by a Quaker doctor. He played a melodeon strapped to the back of the medicine wagon. He stayed with the show only two weeks, however, because the doctor's religion didn't allow the serving of Sunday dinner.

Blake said he composed the melody of "Charleston Rag" in 1899, when he would have been only 12 years old. He did not commit it to paper until 1915, when he learned musical notation.

In 1912, Blake began playing in vaudeville with James Reese Europe's Society Orchestra, which accompanied Vernon and Irene Castle's ballroom dance act. The band played ragtime music, which was still quite popular. Shortly after World War I, Blake formed a vaudeville musical act, the Dixie Duo, with performer Noble Sissle. After vaudeville, they began work on a musical revue, Shuffle Along, which incorporated songs they had written, and had a book written by F. E. Miller and Aubrey Lyles. When it premiered in June 1921, Shuffle Along became the first hit musical on Broadway written by and about African Americans. It also introduced hit songs such as "I'm Just Wild About Harry" and "Love Will Find a Way". Rudolf Fisher insisted that Shuffle Along "had ruined his favorite places of African-American sociability in Harlem" due to the influx of white patrons. Its reliance on "stereotypical black stage humor" and "the primitivist conventions of cabaret," in the words of Thomas Brothers, made the show a hit, running for 504 performances with three years of national tours.

Blake made his first recordings in 1917, for the Pathé record label and for Ampico piano rolls. In the 1920s he recorded for the Victor and Emerson labels, among others.

In 1923, Blake made three films for Lee de Forest in de Forest's Phonofilm sound-on-film process: Noble Sissle and Eubie Blake, featuring their song "Affectionate Dan"; Sissle and Blake Sing Snappy Songs, featuring "Sons of Old Black Joe" and "My Swanee Home"; and Eubie Blake Plays His Fantasy on Swanee River, featuring Blake performing his "Fantasy on Swanee River". These films are preserved in the Maurice Zouary film collection in the Library of Congress collection. Blake also appeared in Warner Brothers' 1932 short film Pie, Pie Blackbird with the Nicholas Brothers, Nina Mae McKinney and Noble Sissle. That year, he and his orchestra also provided most of the music for the film Harlem Is Heaven.

Later life

In July 1910, Blake married Avis Elizabeth Cecelia Lee, proposing to her in a chauffeur-driven car he hired. They met around 1895, when they attended Primary School No. 2 at 200 East Street in Baltimore. In 1910, Blake brought his bride to Atlantic City, New Jersey, where he had already found employment at the Boathouse nightclub.

In 1938, Avis was diagnosed with tuberculosis. She died later that year, at the age of 58. Of his loss, Blake said, "In my life I never knew what it was to be alone. At first when Avis got sick, I thought she just had a cold, but when time passed and she didn’t get better, I made her go to a doctor and we found out she had TB … I suppose I knew from when we found out she had the TB, I understood that it was just a matter of time."

While serving as bandleader with the USO during World War II, he met Marion Grant Tyler, the widow of violinist Willy Tyler. They married in 1945. A performer and businesswoman, she became his valued business manager until her death in 1982. In 1946, Blake retired from performing and enrolled in New York University, where he studied the Schillinger System of music composition, graduating in two and a half years. He spent the next two decades using the Schillinger System to transcribe songs that he had memorized but had never written down.

In the 1970s and 1980s, public interest in Blake's music was revived following the release of his 1969 retrospective album The Eighty-Six Years of Eubie Blake.

Blake was a frequent guest of The Tonight Show Starring Johnny Carson and Merv Griffin. He was featured by leading conductors, such as Leonard Bernstein and Arthur Fiedler. In 1977 he played Will Williams in the Jeremy Kagan biographical film Scott Joplin. By 1975, he had been awarded honorary doctorates from Rutgers, the New England Conservatory, the University of Maryland, Morgan State University, Pratt Institute, Brooklyn College, and Dartmouth. On October 9, 1981, he received the Presidential Medal of Freedom from President Ronald Reagan.

Eubie!, a revue featuring Blake's music, with lyrics by Noble Sissle, Andy Razaf, Johnny Brandon, F. E. Miller and Jim Europe, opened on Broadway in 1978. It was a hit at the Ambassador Theatre, where it ran for 439 performances. It received three nominations for Tony Awards, including one for Blake's score. The show was filmed in 1981 with the original cast members, including Lesley Dockery, Gregory Hines and Maurice Hines.

Blake performed with Gregory Hines on the television program Saturday Night Live on March 10, 1979 (season 4, episode 14).

Death
Blake continued to play and record until his death, on February 12, 1983, in Brooklyn, five days after events celebrating his purported 100th birthday (which was actually his 96th birthday).

He was interred in Cypress Hills Cemetery in Brooklyn, New York. His headstone, engraved with the musical notation of "I'm Just Wild About Harry", was commissioned by the African Atlantic Genealogical Society. A bronze sculpture of Blake's bespectacled face was created by David Byer-Tyre, curator and director of the African American Museum and Center for Education and Applied Arts in Hempstead, New York. The original inscription indicated his correct year of birth, but individuals close to him insisted that Blake be indulged and paid to have the inscription changed.

Blake was reported to have said, on his birthday in 1979, "If I'd known I was going to live this long, I would have taken better care of myself", but this has been attributed to others and has appeared in print at least as early as 1966.

Honors and awards
 1969: Nomination for a Grammy Award for The Eighty-Six Years of Eubie Blake in the category of "Best Instrumental Jazz Performance, Small Group or Soloist with Small Group"

See also

African American musical theater
Age fabrication
Black and Blue (musical)
List of ragtime composers

References

Further reading
 Brooks, Tim, Lost Sounds: Blacks and the Birth of the Recording Industry, 1890–1919, 363–395, Urbana: University of Illinois Press, 2004.
 Carlin, Richard and Ken Bloom. Eubie Blake: Rags, Rhythm, and Race.  Oxford University Press, 2020.

 The New York Times; December 27, 1982, Monday. "Eubie Blake Birthday Party. In honor of Eubie Blake's 100th  birthday, St. Peter's Church, at Lexington Avenue and 54th Street, will hold a 24-hour celebration beginning at midnight February 6. The tribute to the composer will feature a host of musicians, vocalists and dancers, including Billy Taylor, Bobby Short, Dick Hyman, Honi Coles and the Copacetics, Bill Bolcom and Joan Morris, Max Morath, Marianne McPartland, Maurice Hines and Cab Calloway. Mr. Blake, born in Baltimore February 7, 1882, may attend."
 
Williams, Iain Cameron Underneath a Harlem Moon: The Harlem to Paris Years of Adelaide Hall. Bloomsbury Publishers, . Chapter 3: Shuffle-Along Nicely - recounts the Shuffle Along musical.

External links

 Eubie Blake oral histories at Oral History of American Music
 
 
 
 Eubie Blake recordings at the Discography of American Historical Recordings.
 The Eubie Blake National Jazz Institute and Cultural Center, Baltimore, MD
 The Eubie Blake Collection at the Maryland Historical Society
 Eubie Blake & Ragtime includes transcription of 1970 interview with Blake
 William D. and Peggy Smith collection of Eubie Blake correspondence, printed sheet music, and other material, 1970-1977 at Isham Memorial Library, Harvard University

1887 births
1983 deaths
20th-century African-American musicians
20th-century American composers
20th-century American male musicians
20th-century American pianists
20th-century jazz composers
African-American jazz composers
African-American jazz pianists
Age controversies
American jazz composers
American male jazz composers
American male jazz pianists
American musical theatre composers
American street performers
Broadway composers and lyricists
Burials at Cypress Hills Cemetery
George Peabody Medal winners
Jazz musicians from Maryland
Male musical theatre composers
Musicians from Baltimore
Presidential Medal of Freedom recipients
Ragtime composers
Ragtime pianists
Vaudeville performers
Victor Records artists
Emerson Records artists